In Compass Motors Industries (Pty) Ltd v. Callguard (Pty) Ltd, an important case in South African law, Van Zyl, J. expressed the opinion, obiter, that a security firm that had contracted to guard a premises had a legal duty to third parties to guard vehicles lawfully parked on the premises.

See also 
 South African agency law

References 
 Compass Motors Industries (Pty) Ltd v Callguard (Pty) Ltd 1990 (2) SA 520 (W).

Notes 

South African case law
1990 in case law
1990 in South African law